Wild Romance is a 2012 South Korean television series. It aired on KBS2 from January 4 to February 23, 2012 on Wednesdays and Thursdays at 21:55 for 16 episodes. The screwball romantic comedy is about the love-hate relationship between an obnoxious superstar professional baseball player (Lee Dong-wook) and his tomboyish bodyguard (Lee Si-young).

Plot
Brash, arrogant Park Mu-yeol (Lee Dong-wook) is the star player of the pro baseball team Red Dreamers, renowned for both his skill and his bad temper. Stubborn bodyguard-by-trade Yoo Eun-jae (Lee Si-young) hates him; she's a lifelong fan of the Blue Seagulls, the Red Dreamers' rival team. The two mortal enemies are suddenly thrown together by fate.

A chance meeting during a drunken night of karaoke leads to a scuffle, which former judo athlete Eun-jae easily wins, flipping Mu-yeol on his back. The fight was captured on video however and soon erupts into a huge scandal, with Mu-yeol's reputation and Eun-jae's career as a bodyguard at stake. To fix things, their respective employers agree to assign Eun-jae to act as Mu-yeol's bodyguard. The mismatched pair are now around each other round the clock, and in the midst of constant squabbling and working to find each other's weak spots, they find out more about each other than they realized.

Cast
Lee Dong-wook as Park Mu-yeol
Lee Si-young as Yoo Eun-jae
Oh Man-seok as Jin Dong-soo, Mu-yeol's best friend and former teammate
Hwang Sun-hee as Oh Su-young, Dong-soo's wife
Jessica Jung as Kang Jong-hee, Mu-yeol's ex-girlfriend
Kang Dong-ho as Kim Tae-han, PR manager of the Red Dreamers
Lim Ju-eun as Kim Dong-ah, Eun-jae's best friend and housemate
Lee Hee-joon as Go Jae-hyo, reporter
Lee Han-wi as Kevin Jang, Eun-jae's boss
Lee Won-jong as Yoo Young-gil, Eun-jae's father
Jang Tae-hoon as Yoo Chang-ho, Eun-jae's younger brother
Hong Jong-hyun as Seo Yoon-yi
Lee El as Mi-jin
Kim Jin-woo as Jin Woo-young
Lee Bo-hee as Yang Sun-hee, Mu-yeol's maid
Kim Yun-tae as Mi-jin's partner

Reception
In the same timeslot as hit period drama Moon Embracing the Sun, Wild Romance garnered meager ratings of less than 10 percent. But the series gained a loyal following among TV drama fans. When it first began airing, the series was criticized for erratic editing, excessive sound effects and an implausible storyline, but those criticisms soon subsided as viewers praised writer Park Yeon-seon for her smart and irreverent comedy, tension-filled mystery thriller tropes, insightful lines full of depth, creative use of dialogue and intelligent characterization.

Ratings
in the tables below blue numbersrepresents lowest rating and red numbers represents highest rating .

Source: TNmS Media Korea

International broadcast
 It began airing in Japan on TBS on May 7, 2013 as part of the network's "Hallyu Select" programming.
 In Thailand aired on True Asian Series in mid-year 2013.
 In Vietnam aired on VTV3 on September 10, 2013, under the title Chuyện tình nữ vệ sĩ.

Awards and nominations

References

External links
  
 
 
 

2012 South Korean television series debuts
2012 South Korean television series endings
Korean Broadcasting System television dramas
Korean-language television shows
Baseball television series
South Korean romantic comedy television series